Đuro (also transliterated Djuro or Gjuro) is a South Slavic male given name derived from Đurađ (a Serbian variant of George).

It may refer to:

 Đuro Bago (born 1961), a football coach and sports director
 Đuro Basariček (1884–1928), a Croatian politician, lawyer and social activist
 Đuro Daničić (1825–1882), a Serbian philologist
 Đuro Deželić (1838–1907), a Croatian writer
 Đuro Đaković (1886–1929), a Yugoslav communist politician
 Đuro Ferić (1739–1820), a Croatian poet and Jesuit vicar general 
 Đuro Kurepa (1907–1993), a Yugoslav mathematician
 Đuro Salaj (1889–1958), a first president of the United Labour Unions of Yugoslavia
 Đuro Pilar (1846–1893), a Croatian geologist, professor and rector at the University of Zagreb
 Đuro Pucar (1899–1979), a Yugoslav and Bosnian politician
 Đuro Živković (born 1975), a Serbian-Swedish composer and violinist
 Đuro Zec (born 1990), a Serbian football player
 Gjuro Baglivi (1668–1707), an Italian physician and scientist

See also 
 Branko Đurić Đuro (born 1962), a Bosnian actor, comedian, director, and musician
 Đorđe Đura Horvatović (or Đorđe Đuro Horvatović; 1835–1895), a Serbian general and military minister
 Djurö (disambiguation)
 Đura, a Serbian male given name
 Đurovac, a village in the municipality of Prokuplje, Serbia
 Đurović, a Serbian surname
 Đurić, a Serbian surname
 Đurovski or Ǵurovski, a South Slavic surname

Further reading

Serbian masculine given names
Montenegrin masculine given names
Croatian masculine given names